is a Japanese professional footballer who plays as a midfielder for Tokushima Vortis.

Career 
Uchida started his career with Sumire FC Jr. and played later with 17 joined to FC Coruja, in this time attended the Shochi Fukaya High. In the Winter of 2011/2012 signed with J League 2 side Mito HollyHock and played four time, in his first professional season.

Club statistics
Updated to end of 2018 season.

References

External links
Profile at Instagram
Profile at Tokushima Vortis

1993 births
Living people
Association football people from Saitama Prefecture
Japanese footballers
J2 League players
Mito HollyHock players
Tokushima Vortis players
Association football midfielders